Jeffrey Xu (born 3 October 1988) is a Chinese actor based in Singapore and was named as one of the 8 Dukes of Caldecott Hill.

Career
Xu studied performing major at Shanghai Film Art Academy before being discovered through the tenth season of Star Search in 2010, in which he emerged winner.

He made his first drama appearance in Devotion, in which he played an autistic child, which gave him a nomination for Best Newcomer during the Star Awards 2012.

In Star Awards 2013 & Star Awards 2017, Jeffrey gain a nomination for Star Awards for Best Supporting Actor for respective dramas.

In 2013, Jeffrey clinched the "Best Actor in a Supporting Role" award at the 18th Asian Television Awards (ATA) for his role in Marry Me.

In 2015, Xu is involved in more dramas like Crescendo, Sealed with a Kiss, The Journey: Our Homeland , Tiger Mum & Life Is Beautiful has wrapped up a long form drama, Life - Fear Not.

In Star Awards 2016, Xu gained his first award called Top 10 Most Popular Male Artistes.

In 2017, Xu has been involved in a few dramas which are Have a Little Faith & Mightiest Mother-in-Law. He has wrapped up a long form drama, Life Less Ordinary with Chen Liping and Xiang Yun, which was first broadcast on October 2, 2017. In 2018, Xu have been involved in 2 Toggle series drama called Love at Cavenagh Bridge & Blue Tick.

Xu has gotten 1 out of 10 Top 10 Most Popular Male Artistes from 2016 respectively.

In December 2020, Xu, along with other Mediacorp artistes, were under investigation by MND for alleged breach of COVID-19 measures at Xu's birthday celebration.

In Star Awards 2022, Xu won the award for "Best Supporting Actor".

Personal life 
On 22 October 2022, Xu married former Mediacorp artiste, Felicia Chin. They had been dating since 2015.

Filmography

Movies

Television series

TV hosting

Compilation album

Awards and nominations

References

External links
 on toggle.sg

Living people
1988 births
Male actors from Shanghai
Chinese male film actors
Chinese male television actors
21st-century Chinese male actors
Chinese expatriates in Singapore